Wallisia cyanea, or pink quill, is a species of plant of the genus Wallisia in the bromeliad family, native to the rainforests of Ecuador.

The Latin specific epithet cyanea means "blue", referring to the intense purple-violet hue of the flowers.

It has gained the Royal Horticultural Society's Award of Garden Merit.

Wallisia cyanea was formerly placed in Tillandsia, but following DNA analysis, was reassigned to Wallisia.

Cultivars of W. cyanea include Wallisia 'Anita' and Wallisia 'Sandy'.

References

Tillandsioideae
Near threatened plants